Bernard Flint (born 26 May 1952, in Southport, Lancashire, England) is a singer and songwriter who holds the record for the longest continuous run of wins on the ITV talent show, Opportunity Knocks.

Career
A former Royal Navy sailor and window cleaner, television viewers voted him the show's best act for 12 successive weeks in early 1977.

After being propelled to fame by the show, Flint enjoyed a degree of success for a number of years. In terms of record sales, the highpoint of his career was reached when his single, "I Don't Want to Put a Hold On You", rose over a period of six weeks to number three in the UK Singles Chart, in the week ending 23 April 1977. Further success came in the form of another hit, "Southern Comfort", and one gold and two silver selling albums.

In the late 1970s, Flint presented the ITV show, Pop Gospel. In 1985, Flint was one of the co-presenters on the ITV television programme, Mooncat & Co.

Although no longer a commercial recording artist, Flint continues to perform regularly and is active on the after-dinner circuit. His song "I Don't Want to Put a Hold On You" appeared on the 2008 compilation album 70s Dinner Party.

Discography

Albums
 1977: I Don't Want to Put a Hold On You – UK No. 37
 1978: Early Morning Rain
 1979: Just Like a Movie
 2009: Opportunity Strikes Twice

Singles
 1977: "I Don't Want to Put a Hold On You" – UK No. 3
 1977: "Southern Comfort" – UK No. 48
 1977: "If I Had Someone Like You"
 1978: "Smoke Gets in Your Eyes"
 1979: "Dusk Till Dawn"
 1979: "Only Me"
 1980: "Don't Laugh At Me (Cause I'm a Fool)"
 1983: "A Daisy a Day"  – Bernie Flint (sic) with The Children of Freehold Community School, Oldham

References

External links

English male singers
English songwriters
Musicians from Southport
1952 births
Living people
British male songwriters